John Thomas O'Brien (17 February 1893 – 7 May 1934) was an Australian rules footballer who played with South Melbourne in the Victorian Football League (VFL).

Notes

External links 

1893 births
1934 deaths
Australian rules footballers from Victoria (Australia)
Sydney Swans players